County Road 909 is a  road in the municipality of Bø in Nordland County, Norway.

The road branches off from County Road 901 at Pollåsen and runs east until it terminates in reaches the village of Auvåg on the western shore of Jørnfjord. Along the way, the local roads to Ringstadåsan and Ringstad branch off to the north and south, respectively, at Ringstadkrysset (the Ringstad junction). East of the junction the road is also named Pollveien (Poll Road), and to the west it is also named Auvågveien (Auvåg Road).

References

External links
Statens vegvesen – trafikkmeldinger Fv909 (Traffic Information: County Road 909)

909
Bø, Nordland